Giovanni Bianconi may refer to:

 Giovanni Bianconi (journalist) (born 1960), Italian writer and journalist
 Giovanni Bianconi (poet) (1891–1981), Swiss-Italian poet, artist and ethnographer
 Giovanni Giuseppe Bianconi (1809–1878), Italian zoologist, herpetologist, botanist and geologist
 Giovanni Ludovico Bianconi (1717–1781), Italian doctor and antiquarian